Mark Silvers (born November 5, 1986) is an American professional golfer and low level amateur pickleball player.

Silvers was born in Savannah, Georgia. He was an All-American at the University of South Carolina.

Silvers competed on mini-tours after turning professional in 2009. He won Golf Channel's reality show, Big Break Greenbrier in 2012, earning an exemption into the 2013 Greenbrier Classic on the PGA Tour.

Silvers played on PGA Tour Canada in 2014, winning one event and finishing 10th on the Order of Merit. He finished T-14 at the Web.com Tour Qualifying School to earn his 2015 Web.com Tour card.

Silvers finished tied for 54th at the 2015 U.S. Open. Silvers qualified for the tournament by earning medalist honors at sectional qualifying after being an alternate due to his performance at local qualifying.

Professional wins (1)

PGA Tour Canada wins (1)

References

External links

American male golfers
South Carolina Gamecocks men's golfers
PGA Tour golfers
Golfers from Savannah, Georgia
1986 births
Living people